Dinesh Lalintha was a Sri Lankan cricketer. He was a right-handed batsman and right-arm medium-pace bowler who played for Nondescripts Cricket Club.

Lalintha made a single first-class appearance for the team, during the 1999–2000 season, against Kurunegala YCC. In the only innings in which he batted, he scored a duck.

Lalintha took figures of 2-19 from seven overs of bowling.

External links
Dinesh Lalintha at Cricket Archive 

Sri Lankan cricketers
Nondescripts Cricket Club cricketers
Living people
Year of birth missing (living people)
Place of birth missing (living people)